Miriam O'Callaghan (born 6 January 1960) is an Irish television current affairs presenter with RTÉ.

O'Callaghan has presented Prime Time since 1996, and her own summer talk show, Saturday Night with Miriam, from 2005 onwards. In the summer of 2009, she began a radio show, Miriam Meets..., since replaced by live show Sunday with Miriam. She is also the first woman to present a full episode of The Late Late Show, having done so amid a global pandemic when Ryan Tubridy was quarantined with (initially) suspected symptoms of the Covid-19 virus. Following confirmation that Tubridy was COVID-19 positive, O'Callaghan continued in this role until he recovered.

Early life
Her father, Jerry, was a senior civil servant in the Department of Energy. Her mother, also Miriam, was the daughter of a garda sergeant. O'Callaghan studied law at University College Dublin, where she also completed a post-graduate diploma in European Law. She received her Bachelor of Civil Law from UCD in 1979 and Diploma in European Law in 1981.

She was the second child in a family of five. Her brother Jim is a member of the Fianna Fáil leadership team and a barrister. A sister, Anne, had cancer and died aged 33.

Her first television appearance was an advertisement for Avonmore Milk in the early 1980s.

British career
Soon after qualifying as a solicitor in 1983, she moved to London with then husband, Tom McGurk, and applied for a researcher's job at Thames Television. She secured a position on This Is Your Life, then presented by Eamonn Andrews. She then moved onto researching current affairs programmes for Thames and in 1987, she left to train as a BBC Television producer. As a producer, she worked on shows such as Kilroy, Family Matters and Prime Time, responsible for specials from Hong Kong and Jerusalem. O' Callaghan then joined the BBC's current affairs programme Newsnight as a reporter where she worked for ten years. While with Newsnight she oversaw several high-profile investigative programmes, including one on the UDR 4 miscarriage of justice and another miscarriage of justice case about Kiranjit Ahluwalia. She also covered the Northern Ireland Peace Process. She has not ruled out a return to the BBC.

RTÉ career
She was hired by RTÉ and returned to Ireland in 1993 to present Marketplace, an economics and business programme. She juggled working with the BBC and RTÉ at the same time and also worked on the debut series of the ITV show Tonight with Trevor MacDonald. From 1996, RTÉ secured her services exclusively as the presenter of Prime Time.

In 2005, she began the first series of her own summer talk show, Saturday Night with Miriam. O'Callaghan made her debut as a radio presenter on 11 July 2009 on the programme, Miriam Meets, to run for eight weeks. It was confirmed in August 2009 that the programme would return permanently to RTÉ Radio 1 on Sunday mornings. In 2013, she stood in as a long-term replacement on RTÉ Radio One in the key daily morning slot from 9am to 10am when presenter John Murray was on extended sick leave. After this she was given a new live Sunday morning radio show on RTÉ Radio One from 10am until 11am.

At 10am on 24 October 2012, she clicked a mouse in RTÉ NL's national control centre to bring to an end fifty years of analogue television transmission in Ireland.

She flew direct to Luxembourg following the 2016 Brussels bombings and went on to Brussels from where she presented Prime Time that evening, with contributions from Prime Time reporter Robert Short.

She features in the 1993, 1996, 2000 and 2001 programmes of Reeling in the Years.

During the COVID-19 pandemic, she hosted The Late Late Show when Ryan Tubridy was quarantined with (then) suspected symptoms of the virus. Following confirmation that Tubridy was COVID-19 positive, O'Callaghan continued in the role. She was the first female presenter of a full episode of the show (Marian Finucane having presented part of an episode on 15 November 1980). She supported the decision not to give the job to her in 2009 when the vacancy arose and Tubridy took over, saying: "It is probably right. Ryan has done an amazing job and it is still a brilliant show. I got to present it twice... so at least I am in the history books".

Later that year, during the same pandemic, O'Callaghan posed for a photograph with a staff member who was retiring. The Garda Síochána and the Director of Public Prosecutions (DPP) both investigated the incident. O'Callaghan later admitted: "I stood in a photo and took off my mask, and I should not have done that".

Style
O'Callaghan is not known for confronting her subject during interviews. She said: "There is never room for rudeness and sometimes you can overstep the line... If you are a female broadcaster it can get worse, because you end up sounding shrill. Ed Mulhall [RTÉ's former head of news] once advised me that you can ask any question if you ask it in the right tone"".

Earnings
She earned €307,000 in 2011. Her work that year included fronting RTÉ's coverage of Queen Elizabeth II's state visit to the Republic of Ireland in May 2011, and hosting the 12 October 2011 Prime Time TV debate with the seven candidates standing in the 2011 Irish presidential election. Her treatment of Martin McGuinness resulted in more than 100 complaints to RTÉ. She also did RTÉ's 50th anniversary party on New Year's Eve 2011, attended by President of Ireland Michael D. Higgins and Jedward.

Politics
Aside from her brother Jim being a leading member of Fianna Fáil, she was identified in the media as a possible Irish presidential candidate in 2010, though she was quick to deny her interest in the position.

In 2018 she publicly declined to run for president of Ireland.

In 2021, she said: "Those stories [first linking her with the presidency] originated in polls. A couple of parties did polls with a list of names on them, including my name. And for what it's worth, I topped the lot of them". On her own electoral preferences she said that, if there were two candidates, "and one was a woman and the other a man — I would unashamedly give that vote to the woman".

Marriages and children
She has eight children.

After her earliest pregnancy, O'Callaghan had problems and was prescribed Clomid to help with her future pregnancies after attending a fertility specialist on central London's Harley Street. This was immediately successful, with O'Callaghan once managing to have three children in eleven months, a record for her.

Her efforts to have an eighth child took two and a half years. Initially fearful that she would give birth to twins (which would have given her nine children), O'Callaghan expressed relief that this pregnancy would also involve one baby. She told the Sunday Independent: "We had to work hard at this and my husband was under orders to be home at precisely the right moment every month".

Advising other women on pregnancy, O'Callaghan said in 2005: "They say that fertility zooms down after 35 and some girls are giving up, but I believe that if you keep healthy and eat well, there is no reason why you can't go on".

O’Callaghan married her first husband in 1983 and they separated in 1995; she had four daughters at the time; Alannah, Clara, and twins Jessica and Georgia. She met her current husband, Steve Carson, while working on Newsnight. In 2000, the couple married and set up their own television company, Mint Productions. She has four sons with Carson.

Commenting on the difference between being a mother to daughters and later sons (her four daughters were born first, before any of her sons), she said: "There is a lot of Lynx aftershave around at the moment. Boys and girls are like chalk and cheese — equally wonderful but very different".

After giving birth to one of the eight children in 2005, a journalist visited her in hospital to interview her. She later said: "I was covered in blood and waiting to be stitched [after a caesarean section] when someone walked into the room".

She does not sleep at length, though she describes the sleep she does get as "great".

Awards
In 2003, she won the Television Personality of the Year Award at the Irish Film and Television Awards.

She was awarded an honorary Doctor of Letters (D.Litt.) degree by the University of Ulster in Derry on 5 July 2011.

In June 2017 she was awarded an Honorary Doctor of Laws by University College Cork.

She has won the RTÉ Guide Style Award.

In 2015, she was awarded UCD Alumnus of the Year in Law.

References

1960 births
20th-century Irish people
21st-century Irish people
Living people
Alumni of University College Dublin
Irish television talk show hosts
People from Foxrock
Prime Time (Irish TV programme) presenters
RTÉ newsreaders and journalists
RTÉ Radio 1 presenters
Irish women radio presenters
Irish women journalists